The Micronotz, also known as the Mortal Micronotz, were an American punk rock/alternative rock quartet formed in 1980 in Lawrence, Kansas, that, along with bands like The Embarrassment and Get Smart!, were prominent on the local music scene in Lawrence in the early 80s.

History
The band formed in 1980 when all the members were still teenagers. The Embarrassment were looking for an opening band for a show they had booked on December 12, 1980 at the "Off The Wall Hall" (now known as "The Bottleneck"). The Embarrassment knew John Harper and knew that he was putting a band together, so they asked him if his band could open the show, but the band hadn't actually formed yet.  At this point, the band just consisted of John Harper on guitar and David Dale on bass, so a drummer and singer needed to be recruited.  Dean Lubensky and Graham Reece were recruited as vocalist and drummer. Dean was a good fit and became the permanent singer, and Steve Eddy replaced Reece as the drummer.

The band soon came to the attention of local music promoter, Bill Rich, who wrote about them for his "Talk Talk" magazine and then signed them to his Fresh Sounds record label.  Their first release for Fresh Sounds was the 4-band split cassette Fresh Sounds From Middle America (vol 1) in December 1981, just one year after the band formed.  The "Fresh Sounds" compilation series was organized by Bill Rich as a way to promote regional bands nationally.

When the band discovered that Bill Rich was an acquaintance of William S. Burroughs they asked for an introduction and Burroughs would end up giving them some lyrics for a song ("Old Lady Sloan" from the Mortal Micronotz album).

Lead singer, Dean Lubensky, left the band sometime after the 1984 Live Recording of the Video Soundtrack EP.  He was replaced by Jay Hauptli, who would remain the band's vocalist throughout the rest of their career and subsequent reunions.

After releasing three albums and two EPs, the band broke up in 1986.  Bassist David Dale committed suicide on Sunday, January 31, 1993. The surviving band members reunited for a memorial show which was held at the Outhouse on February 6, 1993.

Renewed interest in the band lead Fresh Sounds to release two Micronotz compilations, called Complete Recordings Volume I and II where the first volume covered the Dean Lubensky recordings and the second covered the Jay Hauptli recordings.  A tribute album was also put together featuring William S. Burroughs and various other artists.  The band still does the occasional reunion show, with Matt Kesler, formerly of the Pedaljets, playing bass.

In 2016 the Bar/None label digitally reissued the band's entire catalog.

The Outhouse
The Outhouse was a popular venue in Lawrence for punk shows and not only did the Micronotz perform there, but they also helped get the venue into shape ready to have concerts.  In 1984, the band built the stage, painted the walls and cleared the brush outside.

Reception
"these guys have your standard '70s Ameri-punk moves down cold — sort of a sub-Dead Boys, but tighter" (Jack Partain, Trouser Press) 
"Fueled by blazing electricity, right-angle tempo changes, chop-socky guitar riffs, and a vocalist who gargles glass and the leading shoe polish remover, the Micronotz go the distance to buy a metal sandwich at the 'Psychodeli'" (Judge I-Rankin, Spin, 1987) 
"Midwest teenage snot- rock at the outset, the trebly, tin-can production on early records actually worked to the bands ragged charm. The spanking riffs and barbed hooks served as a perfect backdrop for original singer Dean Lubensky's caterwaul, sounding to all the world like Janis Joplin's horny, pubescent, punked out suburban little brother." (Oliver Hunt, SuperStarcastic.com, 2006)

Discography

Albums

EPs

Compilations

Members

1981-1984
Dean Lubensky - vocals
John Harper - guitar
David Dale - bass
Steve Eddy - drums

1985-1986
Jay Hauptli - vocals
John Harper - guitar
David Dale - bass (died Jan. 31, 1993)
Steve Eddy - drums

2006-present
Jay Hauptli - vocals
John Harper - guitar
Matt Kessler - bass
Steve Eddy - drums

References

External links

Myspace page
Facebook page

American punk rock groups
Musical groups established in 1980
Alternative rock groups from Kansas
Fresh Sounds Records artists
Homestead Records artists